Mandegi-ye Olya (also Romanized as Māndegī-ye ‘Olyā; also known as Māndegī-ye Bālā and Māngī-ye Bālā) is a village in Lay Siyah Rural District, in the Central District of Nain County, Isfahan Province, Iran. At the 2006 census, its population was 28, in 9 families.

References 

Populated places in Nain County